Tasay Par Lar Pyi is a 2018 Burmese horror film, directed by R. Peraks starring Pyay Ti Oo, Ei Chaw Po, Nyi Htut Khaung and Khin Hlaing. The film, produced by Lucky Seven Film Production premiered Myanmar on October 19, 2018.

Cast
Pyay Ti Oo as Nyi Lwin
Ei Chaw Po as Myat Noe
Nyi Htut Khaung as Mhan Lay
Khin Hlaing as Maw Si
Aung Zaw Min

References

2018 films
2010s Burmese-language films
Burmese horror films
Films shot in Myanmar
2018 horror films